Guéla Doué (born 17 October 2002) is a French professional footballer who plays as a right-back for Ligue 1 club Rennes.

Club career

Early career in Rennes 
Having joined the Stade Rennais as an eight years old, Guéla Doué was part of a 2002 generation comprising the likes of Eduardo Camavinga, Brandon Soppy and Georginio Rutter. He began playing with Rennes National 3 reserves in 2020–21. 

The young defender signed his first professional contract with the club on 18 November 2021. His progress through the 2021–22 season was however halted by a serious injury, making his way back with the reserve only in May 2022, still managing to help them winning promotion to the National 2 after only narrowly topping the Brittany group.

First professional season in Brittany 
Guéla Doué made his first team debut during the 2022 summer friendlies, joining his brother Désiré on the field against Caen.

Having already appeared several times on the bench in Ligue 1 under Bruno Génésio's management, on 17 January 2023 Guéla extended his contract with the club until 2025.

He made his senior debut with Rennes in a 3–0 league win over Strasbourg on 1 February 2023, coming in as a late substitute for his younger brother, who had just became the youngest ever player to deliver an assist and score a goal in a Ligue 1 game.

Personal life
Born in France, Doué is of Ivorian descent. His younger brother Désiré, and his cousins Yann Gboho and Marc-Olivier Doué are also professional footballers.

References

External links
 

2002 births
Living people
Sportspeople from Angers
French footballers
French sportspeople of Ivorian descent
Association football fullbacks
Association football central defenders
Ligue 1 players
Championnat National 2 players
Championnat National 3 players
Stade Rennais F.C. players